José Gregorio Rondón Hidalgo (born March 3, 1994) is a Venezuelan professional baseball infielder for the Toros de Tijuana of the Mexican League. He previously played in Major League Baseball (MLB) for the San Diego Padres, Chicago White Sox, Baltimore Orioles, and St. Louis Cardinals.

Career

Los Angeles Angels
Rondón was signed by the Los Angeles Angels of Anaheim as an international free agent on January 13, 2011. He made his professional debut that season with the Dominican Summer League Angels. He started 2014 with the Inland Empire 66ers. In July he played in the All-Star Futures Game as an injury replacement for Carlos Correa.

San Diego Padres
On July 31, 2014, Rondón, along with Taylor Lindsey, R. J. Alvarez and Elliot Morris, was traded to the San Diego Padres for Huston Street and Trevor Gott. The Padres assigned him to the Lake Elsinore Storm.

On November 19, 2015, the Padres added Rondón to their 40-man roster to protect him from the Rule 5 draft. Rondón was called up to the major leagues on July 29, 2016, and he made his major league debut that night as a pinch hitter for Edwin Jackson, wearing #13. On January 6, 2018, he was designated for assignment by the Padres.

Chicago White Sox
On January 10, 2018, Rondón was acquired by the Chicago White Sox. Rondón ended the year playing in 42 games with the White Sox, hitting .230/.280/.470 in 107 plate appearances.

On July 28, 2019, Rondón was designated for assignment. In 2019 with the White Sox, Rondón batted .197/.265/.282 in 156 plate appearances throughout 55 games.

Baltimore Orioles
On July 30, 2019, Rondón was claimed off waivers by the Baltimore Orioles. He was designated for assignment on August 3, 2019, and outrighted on August 7. Rondon received only one at bat for the Orioles against Toronto Blue Jays pitcher Buddy Boshers and popped out to catcher Danny Jansen. He became a free agent on November 2, 2020.

St. Louis Cardinals
On December 18, 2020, Rondón signed a minor league contract with the St. Louis Cardinals organization. On May 29, 2021, Rondón was selected to the active roster. Rondón mostly served as a pinch hitter for St. Louis, batting .308/.349/.564 in that role.
On November 30, 2021, Rondon was non-tendered by the Cardinals, making him a free agent.

On April 4, 2022, Rondón was suspended by MLB for 80 games after violation of their Joint Drug Prevention and Treatment Program, testing positive for Boldenone.

Toros de Tijuana
On December 12, 2022, Rondón signed with the Toros de Tijuana of the Mexican League.

See also
 List of Major League Baseball players from Venezuela

References

External links

1994 births
Living people
Arizona League Angels players
Baltimore Orioles players
Charlotte Knights players
Chicago White Sox players
Dominican Summer League Angels players
Inland Empire 66ers of San Bernardino players
Lake Elsinore Storm players
Leones del Caracas players
Major League Baseball players from Venezuela
Major League Baseball shortstops
Navegantes del Magallanes players
Norfolk Tides players
Orem Owlz players
San Antonio Missions players
San Diego Padres players
St. Louis Cardinals players
Tigres de Aragua players
Venezuelan expatriate baseball players in the United States
Venezuelan expatriate baseball players in the Dominican Republic
People from Villa de Cura